Le Mauricien is a French-language newspaper, based and distributed in Mauritius. The newspaper, founded in 1908, is released daily and is one of the most read in Mauritius. The publishers, Le Mauricien Ltd., also publish Week-End, Week-End Scope and Turf Magazine. It is an independent newspaper.

History 
Le Mauricien was founded in 1908 and celebrated its hundredth anniversary in 2008. Some former editors include Raoul Rivet, André Masson, Lindsay Rivière among others. The editor and director was Raoul Rivet from 1922 to 1957.Le Mauricien adopted the offset press in 1978 and subsequently experienced changes namely by growing from four pages to the current forty-eight page daily edition. Its price has evolved as well. In 1978, the newspaper's office was set on fire which and was later deemed as a criminal act. Le Mauricien adopted a "midi" format known as the Berliner format in 2010. The pages increased to 48 and this becomes similar to leading papers elsewhere like Le Figaro (France), The Guardian (UK). In 2012, Le Mauricien upgraded its website and aligned it with other papers where readers could send comments to published articles.

The Compact Tabloid Format

As from July 2014, Le Mauricien has adopted the compact tabloid format close to The Times of the UK.  The pages have been reduced to 40 while the midi format was repealed.  Compared to an older version of the same paper, the paper size is reduced by 55%.  This adds to a new era in news publishing.

General information
Le Mauricien headquarters is located on 8 rue St Georges, Port Louis. The current director is Jacques Rivet and deputy director is Bernard Delaître.

See also 

List of newspapers in Mauritius

References

External links
 Website

Newspapers published in Mauritius
Newspapers established in 1908
1908 establishments in Mauritius